Gladkikh is a rural locality (a village) in Metelinsky Selsoviet, Duvansky District, Bashkortostan, Russia. The population was 12 as of 2010.

Geography 
Gladkikh is located 78 km southwest of Mesyagutovo (the district's administrative centre) by road. Meteli is the nearest rural locality.

References 

Rural localities in Duvansky District